Saint-Amé is a commune in the Vosges department in Grand Est in northeastern France.

See also
Communes of the Vosges department
 Saint Ame, a Benedictine abbot and hermit who is also called Saint Amatus.
 Saint Aimé, the abbot of the Agaune monastery in Switzerland and bishop of the Sens (or Sion) diocese.

References

Communes of Vosges (department)
Vosges communes articles needing translation from French Wikipedia